
The Bombing of Normandy during the Normandy invasion was meant to destroy the German communication lines in the Norman cities and towns.  However, very few Germans occupied these municipalities.  German troops were mostly located outside these areas. On 9 July 1944, Field Marshal Bernard Montgomery demanded a massive air assault against Caen in hopes of clearing the way for an attack the following morning. Four hundred and fifty heavy aircraft participated, dropping 2,500 tons of bombs. The pilots however negated most of the effect by releasing their loads well back from the forward line to avoid hitting their own troops. As a result, the city incurred heavy damage but German defenses went largely unscathed.

Allied heavy bomber missions caused serious problems for both Allied ground forces and French civilians, during the early stages of the campaign.

Sometimes friendly troops were victims of misplaced bomb strikes. In the early stages of the Normandy campaign, this often resulted from insufficient communication between air and land forces, which had to get used to working together. US General Omar Bradley remarked after the war that We went into France almost totally untrained in air-ground cooperation."

The first two strikes on Caen resulted in numerous casualties to French civilians.  According to Antony Beevor in his book D-Day,

The bombings also destroyed 96% of Tilly-la-Campagne (Calvados), 95% of Vire (Calvados), 88% of Villers-Bocage (Calvados), 82% of Le Havre (Seine-Maritime), 77% of Saint-Lô (Manche), 76% of Falaise (Calvados), 75% of Lisieux (Calvados), 75% of Caen (Calvados).

It is estimated that the bombings in Normandy before and after D-Day caused over 20,000 civilian deaths. The French historian Henri Amouroux in La Grande histoire des Français sous l’Occupation'', says that 20,000 civilians were killed in Calvados department, 10,000 in Seine-Maritime, 14,800 in the Manche, 4,200 in the Orne, around 3,000 in the Eure. The most deadly allied bombings under the German occupation were these: Lisieux (6–7 June 1944, 700 dead), Vire (6–7 June 1944, 400 dead), Caen (6 June-19 July 1944, about 3,000 dead), Le Havre (5–11 September 1944, more than 5,000 dead)

Although liberation was well worth the cost, for some families who lived through the war, it was the arrival and passage of British and American forces that was the most traumatizing experience. According to Christophe Prime, "It was profoundly traumatic for the people of Normandy.  Think of the hundreds of tons of bombs destroying entire cities and wiping out families. But the suffering of civilians was for many years masked by the over-riding image, that of the French welcoming the liberators with open arms."

See also
Battle for Caen
Bombing of France during World War II
Operation Charnwood

References

Citations

Works cited

Normandy
France in World War II
1940s in France
Normandy
Operation Overlord
Normandy